Brinon-sur-Sauldre (literally Brinon on Sauldre) is a commune in the Cher department in the Centre-Val de Loire region of France.

Geography
The commune has the Beuvron river forming its northern border with the department of Loir-et-Cher.

Population

Sights
 The church of St. Barthélemy, dating from the eleventh century.
 Traces of a thirteenth-century castle at Launay.

See also
Communes of the Cher department

References

External links

Official website of the commune  

Communes of Cher (department)
Orléanais